Celery is an open source asynchronous task queue or job queue which is based on distributed message passing. While it supports scheduling, its focus is on operations in real time.

Overview
The execution units, called tasks, are executed concurrently on one or more worker nodes using multiprocessing, eventlet or gevent. Tasks can execute asynchronously (in the background) or synchronously (wait until ready). Celery is used in production systems, for services such as Instagram, to process millions of tasks every day.

Technology
Celery is written in Python, but the protocol can be implemented in any language. It can also operate with other languages using webhooks. There is also a Ruby-Client called RCelery, a PHP client, a Go client, a Rust client, and a Node.js client.

The recommended message brokers are RabbitMQ or Redis. In comparison with RabbitMQ, Redis represents a good start. However, if there is a valid reason and Redis is no longer meeting the requirements for the project, it is simple to switch to RabbitMQ. Additionally, MongoDB, Amazon SQS, CouchDB, IronMQ, and databases (using SQLAlchemy or the Django ORM) are supported in status experimental.

See also

Advanced Message Queuing Protocol

References

External links

Free system software
Free software programmed in Python
Python (programming language) software
Concurrent programming libraries
Inter-process communication
Message-oriented middleware
Software using the BSD license